Howmeh Rural District is a rural district (dehestan) in the Central District of Kahnuj County, Kerman Province, Iran. At the 2006 census, its population was 10,491, in 2,180 families. The rural district has 33 villages.

References 

Rural Districts of Kerman Province
Kahnuj County